The 1852 Vermont gubernatorial election was held on Tuesday, September 7. Incumbent governor Charles K. Williams, a Whig, was not a candidate for reelection. In the voting, Whig Erastus Fairbanks received 49.2 percent, Democrat John S. Robinson 31.3 percent, and Free Soil Party nominee Lawrence Brainerd 19.6 percent.

In accordance with the Vermont Constitution, because no candidate received 50 percent of the vote, the election was decided by the Vermont General Assembly. On October 16, with 110 votes by the combined Vermont House of Representatives and Vermont Senate necessary for a choice, Fairbanks won on the first ballot with 117 votes to 61 for Robinson and 40 for Brainerd. On Monday October 18, Fairbanks took the oath of office and began a one-year term.

General election

Results

References
 

1852
Vermont
Gubernatorial
October 1852 events